Conasprella delessertii, common name Sozon's cone, is a species of sea snail, a marine gastropod mollusk in the family Conidae, the cone snails and their allies.

This species couldn't be placed in any subgenus of Conasprella and is therefore designated as incertae sedis.

Like all species within the genus Conasprella, these snails are predatory and venomous. They are capable of "stinging" humans, therefore live ones should be handled carefully or not at all. It was named after Benjamin Delessert (1773–1847), a French banker and naturalist.

Description 
The maximum recorded shell length is 100 mm.

Habitat 
Minimum recorded depth is 15 m. Maximum recorded depth is 198 m.

Distribution
This marine species occurs in the Gulf of Mexico. This species is also found in the North Atlantic Ocean off Florida and on shipwrecks in North Carolina.

References

 Bartsch, P. (1939). Smithson. Misc. Collns. 98 (10): 1, plate 1, figure 1–3.
 Tucker, J. K. & Tenorio, M. J. (2013) Illustrated Catalog of the Living Cone Shells. 517 pp. Wellington, Florida: MdM Publishing.
 Puillandre, N.; Duda, T. F.; Meyer, C.; Olivera, B. M. & Bouchet, P. (2015).  "One, four or 100 genera? A new classification of the cone snails". Journal of Molluscan Studies. 81: 1–23.

External links
 The Conus Biodiversity website
 Cone Shells – Knights of the Sea
 

delessertii
Gastropods described in 1843